Events in the year 2011 in San Marino.

Incumbents 
 Captains Regent: 
Giovanni Francesco Ugolini, Andrea Zafferani (until 1 April)
Maria Luisa Berti, Filippo Tamagnini (from 1 April to 1 October)
Gabriele Gatti, Matteo Fiorini (from 1 October)

Events

Arts and entertainment 
In music: San Marino in the Eurovision Song Contest 2011.

Sports 
Football (soccer) competitions: Campionato Sammarinese di Calcio, Coppa Titano.

Deaths

See also 

 2011 in Europe
 City states

References 

 
Years of the 21st century in San Marino
San Marino
San Marino
2010s in San Marino